John Henry Wilson (14 February 1834 – 3 July 1912) was a Canadian physician, professor, and parliamentarian.  A Liberal, he served two terms as a Member of Parliament representing the electoral district of Elgin East in the province of Ontario. He also represented Elgin East in the Legislative Assembly of Ontario from 1871 to 1879.

He was born near Ottawa, Upper Canada in 1834, the grandson of a United Empire Loyalist. He studied medicine at the Toronto School of Medicine (later the Faculty of Medicine at the University of Toronto) and  New York University. He received his M.D. in 1859 and was appointed professor of anatomy at Victoria College. In 1860, he opened a medical practice in St. Thomas, Ontario. He was elected to the provincial legislature in 1871 and 1875. He was elected to the federal parliament in the Canadian federal election of 1882 and was re-elected in 1887. On 8 March 1904 he was appointed to the Senate of Canada upon the recommendation of Sir Wilfrid Laurier. He represented the senatorial division of St. Thomas, Ontario until his death in 1912.

External links 
 
 
A Cyclopæedia of Canadian biography : being chiefly men of the time..., GM Rose (1886)

1834 births
1912 deaths
Members of the House of Commons of Canada from Ontario
Liberal Party of Canada MPs
Liberal Party of Canada senators
Canadian senators from Ontario
Ontario Liberal Party MPPs
People from St. Thomas, Ontario